Gambian passports are issued to Gambian citizens to travel outside the Gambia.

Physical properties

 Surname
 Given names
 Nationality Gambian
 Date of birth
 Sex
 Place of birth
 Date of Expiry
 Passport number

Languages

The data page/information page is printed in English and French.

See also 

 ECOWAS passports
 List of passports
 Visa policy of Gambia
 Visa requirements for Gambian citizens

References

Passports by country
Government of the Gambia
The Gambia and the Commonwealth of Nations